Wave is the sixth studio album released by Canadian group Patrick Watson. It was released on October 19, 2019.

Critical reception

Wave received generally favorable reviews from critics. At Metacritic, which assigns a normalized rating out of 100 to reviews from mainstream publications, the album received an average score of 73 based on 7 reviews.

In the Sputnikmusic review, staff member SowingSeason praised the album as "texturally and aesthetically jaw-dropping, perfected by an artist who clearly took his time accentuating the beauty and sadness of every moment."

The album was a Juno Award nominee for Adult Alternative Album of the Year at the Juno Awards of 2020.

Track listing

Charts

References

2019 albums
Patrick Watson (musician) albums